Jericho Season 3: Civil War is a comic book limited series of six issues  that continues the storyline of the CBS television show Jericho. It was written by Jason M. Burns and the Jericho writing team.

On March 12, 2009, Devil's Due Publishing announced that all storylines from the TV series will be continued in a comic book series. On November 25, 2009, Devil's Due Publishing released the first issue of the six-issue continuation of the Jericho saga. As of May 29, 2011, IDW Publishing has re-released the first 3 comics as Jericho: Redux, as well as issues 4, 5 and 6, thus completing its publication.

In August 2011, IDW collected all 6 comics into a 144-page graphic novel entitled Jericho Season 3: Civil War.

Plot synopsis 
At the conclusion of the TV series, the new Cheyenne-based Allied States of America governs the former United States west of the Mississippi River, with the exception of Texas. The eastern United States are governed by a rival remnant of the old United States constitutional government, based in Columbus, Ohio.  Texas was about to form an alliance with the ASA.  To prevent this, Jake Green and Robert Hawkins have delivered the last nuclear bomb – which was intended to destroy Columbus, Ohio – to the Independent Republic of Texas.  Analysis of the bomb will demonstrate that the ASA lied about the origin of the 23 bombs used in the September Attacks on 23 U.S. cities, falsely blaming them on the Iranian and North Korean governments.  Texas now sides with Columbus rather than Cheyenne, and the Second American Civil War is at hand.

Hawkins and the Texas leadership know they need something more to help win the war. Hawkins gets a message from an old enemy who just might be able to help, if Hawkins can help him first. This sends Jake Green and Robert Hawkins back into the hostile Allied States where they are wanted for acts of terrorism.

Issues

References

Further reading

External links 
 Interview with Dan Shotz and Cody DeMatteis about Jericho Season 3 

Comics based on television series
Jericho (2006 TV series)
Post-apocalyptic comics